Book of Gomorrah may refer to :

The Book of Gomorrah is a book of ecclesiastical discipline written by Peter Damian in 1049.
Gomorrah is a book by Roberto Saviano published in 2006.